Uman may refer to:

Places
Uman, a town in central Ukraine
Uman Raion, Ukraine
Oman, a country on the Arabian Peninsula
Uman Island, Micronesia
Uman, Chuuk, a municipality in Micronesia
Umán, a city in Mexico
Umán Municipality, a municipality in Mexico
Uman (Peru), a mountain in Peru

Other uses
 Uman language, an extinct language of Brazil
 SS Uman, ship